Sharifabad (also Romanized as Sharīfābād; also known as Fattāḩ and Qābān Bāsān) is a village in Yowla Galdi Rural District, in the Central District of Showt County, West Azerbaijan Province, Iran. In the 2006 census, its population was 382, with 94 families.

References 

Populated places in Showt County